Events from the year 1949 in Canada.

Incumbents

Crown 
 Monarch – George VI

Federal government 
 Governor General – the Viscount Alexander of Tunis
 Prime Minister – Louis St. Laurent
 Chief Justice – Thibaudeau Rinfret (Quebec) 
 Parliament – 20th (until 30 April) then 21st (from 15 September)

Provincial governments

Lieutenant governors 
Lieutenant Governor of Alberta – John C. Bowen   
Lieutenant Governor of British Columbia – Charles Arthur Banks 
Lieutenant Governor of Manitoba – Roland Fairbairn McWilliams  
Lieutenant Governor of New Brunswick – David Laurence MacLaren 
Lieutenant Governor of Newfoundland – Albert Walsh (until September 15) then Leonard Outerbridge 
Lieutenant Governor of Nova Scotia – John Alexander Douglas McCurdy 
Lieutenant Governor of Ontario – Ray Lawson 
Lieutenant Governor of Prince Edward Island – Joseph Alphonsus Bernard 
Lieutenant Governor of Quebec – Eugène Fiset 
Lieutenant Governor of Saskatchewan – John Michael Uhrich

Premiers 
Premier of Alberta – Ernest Manning   
Premier of British Columbia – Boss Johnson  
Premier of Manitoba – Douglas Campbell 
Premier of New Brunswick – John McNair 
Premier of Newfoundland – Joey Smallwood 
Premier of Nova Scotia – Angus Macdonald 
Premier of Ontario – Thomas Laird Kennedy (until May 4) then Leslie Frost 
Premier of Prince Edward Island – J. Walter Jones  
Premier of Quebec – Maurice Duplessis 
Premier of Saskatchewan – Tommy Douglas

Territorial governments

Commissioners 
 Commissioner of Yukon – John Edward Gibben 
 Commissioner of Northwest Territories – Hugh Llewellyn Keenleyside

Events

March 31 - Newfoundland becomes Canada's 10th province at a fraction of a second from April 1.
April 1 - Joey Smallwood becomes the first premier of Newfoundland as a Canadian province
April 4 - Canada joins the North Atlantic Treaty Organization (NATO)
May 4 - Leslie Frost becomes premier of Ontario, replacing Thomas Kennedy
June 27 - Federal election: Louis Saint Laurent's Liberals win a fourth consecutive majority
August 22 - Queen Charlotte earthquake: Canada's largest earthquake since the 1700 Cascadia earthquake
September 9 - Albert Guay affair: in-flight bombing of a Canadian Pacific Airlines DC-3 en route from Quebec City to Baie-Comeau
September 14 - The Noronic, the largest Canadian passenger ship on the Great Lakes, is destroyed by a fire while docked in Toronto, killing 118.

Full date unknown
Canadian appeals to the Judicial Committee of the Privy Council are abolished, making the Supreme Court of Canada the country's top court
British Columbia gives Asian-Canadians the vote

Arts and literature

Awards
See 1949 Governor General's Awards for a complete list of winners and finalists for those awards.
Stephen Leacock Award: Angeline Hango, Truthfully Yours

Sport 
April 16 – The Toronto Maple Leafs win their eighth (third consecutive) Stanley Cup by defeating the Detroit Red Wings 4 games to 0. The deciding Game 4 was played at Maple Leaf Gardens in Toronto
May 16 – The Quebec Junior Hockey League's Montreal Royals win their only Memorial Cup by defeating the Manitoba Junior Hockey League's Brandon Wheat Kings 4 games to 3 (with 1 tie). The deciding game was played Shea's Amphitheatre in Winnipeg
November 26 – The Montreal Alouettes win their first Grey Cup by defeating the Calgary Stampeders 28–15 in the 37th Grey Cup played at Varsity Stadium in Toronto

Births

January to March

January 24 - Guy Charron, ice hockey player
February 14 - Denis Rocan, politician
February 23 - Marc Garneau, astronaut, engineer and politician
March 3 - Elijah Harper, politician (d. 2013)
March 16 - Victor Garber, actor and singer
March 16 - Jane Haist, discus thrower and shot putter
March 25 - Jean Potvin, ice hockey player (d. 2022)
March 29 - Pauline Marois, social worker, civil servant and 30th premier of Quebec 
March 30 - Liza Frulla, politician

April to June

April 4 - Nava Starr, chess player and a Women's International Master 
April 6 - Réginald Bélair, politician
April 8 - Claudette Bradshaw, politician
April 14 - Percy Mockler, politician and Senator
April 16 - Sandy Hawley, jockey
April 18 - Jean-Paul Saint-Pierre, politician, Mayor of Russell, Ontario (since 2010) (d. 2014)
April 26 - Ray Henault, general and Chief of Defence Staff
May 6 - Diane Ablonczy, politician
May 20 - Sheldon Oberman, children's writer (d. 2004)
May 20 - Dave Thomas, comedian and actor
June 7 - Christopher W. Morris, philosopher and academic
June 21 - Jane Urquhart, writer
June 22 - Wayne Easter, politician

July to September

July 3 - Jan Smithers, actress
July 11 - Liona Boyd, classical guitarist
July 12 - Ted Barris, writer, journalist, professor, and broadcaster
August 4 - Danny Williams, politician and 9th Premier of Newfoundland and Labrador
August 13 - Bobby Clarke, ice hockey player
August 21 - Larry Fisher, murderer (d. 2015)
August 30 - Don Boudria, politician and Minister
September 6 - Carole-Marie Allard, politician
September 12 - Kevin Major, author
September 26 - Marie Tifo, actress

October to December

October 24 - Robert Pickton, serial killer
October 25 - Laurie Skreslet, mountaineer, first Canadian to reach the summit of Mount Everest
October 27 - Garth Drabinsky, film and theatrical producer and entrepreneur
November 27 - Nick Discepola, politician
November 28 - Paul Shaffer, musician, actor, voice actor, author, comedian and composer
November 29 - Stan Rogers, folk musician and songwriter (d. 1983)
December 13 - Denise Leblanc-Bantey, politician (d. 1999)
December 19 - Larry Bagnell, politician
December 21 - John Loewen, businessman and politician
December 30 - Jim Flaherty, politician and Minister (d. 2014)

Full date unknown
Zahra Kazemi, photographer, died in Iranian custody (d. 2003)

Deaths

January to June
January 9 - Tom Longboat, long-distance runner (b. 1887)
January 11 - John Wesley Brien, physician and politician (b. 1864)
February 12 - Pegi Nicol MacLeod, artist (b. 1904)
June 2 - François Blais, politician (b. 1875)

July to December
July 7 - Fred Wellington Bowen, politician (b. 1877)
August 23 - Herbert Greenfield, politician and 4th Premier of Alberta (b. 1869)
September 2 - Ian Alistair Mackenzie, politician and Minister (b. 1890)
December 7 - Stanislas Blanchard, politician (b. 1871)
December 16 - Albert Edward Matthews, 16th Lieutenant Governor of Ontario (b. 1873)
December 16 - Sidney Olcott, film producer, director, actor and screenwriter (b. 1873)

See also
 List of Canadian films

Historical documents
Illingworth cartoon depicts Stalin-shaped mushroom cloud overshadowing western Europe and North America

Joint US-Canadian defence strategy must address not only huge Soviet force in Europe, but its recently revealed atomic weapon capability

"This struggle [with Communism] is coming closer and closer" - Canada should be aware that it has U.S.S.R. on its northern border

Denial of NATO "automatic commitment" comes from old idea of U.S.A. and Canada as "producers and not consumers of security"

Despite disapproval, Canada would strengthen its Article 2 on cultural, economic and social collaboration in draft NATO treaty

After prolonged objection to NATO treaty Article 2 by U.S. Senators, they publicly praise it as one reason for ratification

U.S.A. undermines Canada's export economy and aid to European recovery, and unfairly criticizes defence spending

Discussion of suggested USA-UK-Canada federation, UK's place in Europe, and Europe's economic decline as world industrializes

"Spectre of starvation, not only of the body, but also of the mind" - Canadians organize for cultural reconstruction of Europe

Canada raises $1 million for aid to devastated countries, including 5,000 school food boxes, 30,000 library books, and artists' equipment

PM Nehru explains India's "championship of freedom and racial equality in Asia" and asks Canada's support for liberty and against want

National Film Board's history of independent international distribution bothers Department of External Affairs

"(UNESCO should reject) projects not likely to achieve immediately useful results" - Example of Canada's role as helpful fixer

Letters of appreciation about (and from) displaced persons brought from Europe by government to work in Canada

Given their unpopularity in Canada, External Affairs urged to be judicious about allowing Germans in

"Running a war and a wide-open immigration policy at the same time[ – there's] no alternative" - Newspaper columnist on Israel

Canadian leadership tries to settle dispute in refugee organization over Jewish emigration to Palestine conflict zone

Canadian diplomat on elimination of corruption and black market and other positive changes in China following Communist takeover

"Undesirable contacts" - Federal official is leery about stationing Black U.S. troops near Inuit

Hydro-electricity, boundary waters, roads and railways: Canada wants information on U.S. interest in northwestern North America

Historical and diplomatic reasons for retaining "Alert" name for joint U.S.-Canadian weather station on Ellesmere Island

"You are joining a good country" - Prime Minister St. Laurent's speech on Newfoundland's entry into Confederation

"The Catholic Syndicates appear to have shunned [a] settlement" - Violence and unspoken motivation behind Quebec's Asbestos Strike

Film: newsreel of strikers, strikebreakers and police in Asbestos, Quebec

"The most powerful social and moral authority in the community" - Sociologist says unions are replacing church in Windsor, Ont.

Discussions between George Hislop and Jim Egan are roots of Toronto-area gay liberation

Fearing recent total war effort may result in permanent checks on individual rights, senator introduces draft bill of rights

"A more complete[...]Canadian democracy" - Canadian Jewish Congress promotes national institutions for cultural understanding

Massey Commission suggests questions on influences and possibilities to Ernest MacMillan for his critical study of Canadian music

"A cultural renaissance[...]from the grass roots" - Calgary Allied Arts Council urges Massey Commission to back community arts

"A new and gifted player" - Jazz at the Philharmonic presents Oscar Peterson's debut at Carnegie Hall, New York

Film: newsreel of cruise ship burning in Toronto harbour with scores of lives lost

Advertisement: CP Air staged flight to Australia with Honolulu and Fiji stopovers

References

 
Years of the 20th century in Canada
Canada
1949 in North America